It's Adam and Shelley is a British television variety series written by brother and sister Adam and Shelley Longworth. The series was directed by Tim Kirkby and was broadcast on BBC Three from 1 October to 5 November 2007.

Following poor reception and ratings, the show was axed by BBC Three in December 2007.

Episodes
It's Adam and Shelley was originally planned as a one-off pilot but was later picked up for a full six-part series earlier in 2007. The six episodes began airing on 1 October 2007 and finished on 5 November 2007.

References

External links
 
 It's Adam and Shelley at BBC Online

2007 British television series debuts
2007 British television series endings
BBC television comedy